British rock band Bring Me the Horizon have released six studio albums, two live albums, two compilation albums, one remix album, two extended plays (EPs), one demo album, 31 singles, two video albums, 36 music videos, two other releases and three other appearances. Formed in Sheffield in 2004 by vocalist Oliver Sykes, guitarists Lee Malia and Curtis Ward, bassist Matt Kean and drummer Matt Nicholls, the band released their debut EP This Is What the Edge of Your Seat Was Made For on Thirty Days of Nights Records in 2005, which reached number 41 on the UK Budget Albums Chart. After signing with British independent record label Visible Noise, the group released their debut full-length studio album Count Your Blessings in 2006, which reached the top 100 of the UK Albums Chart and the top 10 of the UK Rock & Metal Albums Chart. The 2008 follow-up Suicide Season reached the UK top 50 and charted in the US for the first time when it reached number 107 on the Billboard 200. In November 2009, an expanded version of the album titled Suicide Season Cut Up! was released, featuring remixes and videos.

Ward left the band in early 2009 and was replaced by Jona Weinhofen. The new lineup released There Is a Hell Believe Me I've Seen It. There Is a Heaven Let's Keep It a Secret. in 2010, which reached number 13 on the UK Albums Chart and number 17 on the US Billboard 200. The album's lead single "It Never Ends" was also the band's first to chart, reaching number 103 on the UK Singles Chart, while the track "Blessed with a Curse" reached the top 10 of the UK Rock & Metal Singles Chart.
Weinhofen left the group in early 2013 and was replaced by keyboardist Jordan Fish. Now signed with RCA Records and Sony Music, Bring Me the Horizon released their fourth album Sempiternal a few months later, which reached number three on the UK Albums Chart and was certified gold in the UK, the US and Australia. Three singles from the album – "Sleepwalking", "Go to Hell, for Heaven's Sake" and "Can You Feel My Heart" – reached the top 30 of the US Mainstream Rock Songs chart. The band's debut EP and first three albums were later released as a limited edition vinyl box set in November 2014.

In 2014, the group released the single "Drown", which was the band's first to reach the top 20 of the UK Singles Chart and top the UK Rock & Metal Singles Chart.
A re-recorded version of Die4U was later included on the band's fifth album That's the Spirit, which was released in September 2015 and peaked at number two in both the UK and the US. Four further singles – "Happy Song", "Throne", "True Friends" and "Follow You" – later topped the UK Rock & Metal Singles Chart. The band's first live video album, Live at Wembley, was also released in 2015. Live at the Royal Albert Hall, recorded in April 2016 with a full orchestra, followed in December 2016.
The band released the singles "Mantra" and "Wonderful Life" in August and October 2018, respectively, while the singles "Medicine", "Mother Tongue" and "Nihilist Blues" were released in January 2019. Bring Me the Horizon's sixth studio album Amo was released on 25 January 2019. The album continues Bring Me the Horizon's progression into the genres of pop rock, hard rock, alternative rock and electronic rock, while also incorporating elements of pop and electronica. Amo would become Bring Me the Horizon's first UK chart topper on the UK Albums Chart by debuting at number 1 and eventually be certified gold in their home country by the BPI.

Post Human: Survival Horror would continue this trend by peaking at number one in the UK after being released on physical formats on 22 January 2021. This would chart higher after debuting at number 5 in October 2020 solely on digital formats. Post Human: Survival Horror got certified silver in the UK in the backend of July 2021, as well as gifting Bring Me the Horizon three UK Top 40 hits in 2020 with the likes of "Parasite Eve", their highest-charting single since "Drown" in 2014, debuting at 28 on the UK Singles Chart. "Obey", a collaboration with British rock singer Yungblud, and "Teardrops" being the other singles from the record to debut and peak within the Top 40 on the UK Singles Chart.

Albums

Studio albums

Live albums

Compilation albums

Remix albums

Demo albums

Extended plays

Other commercial releases

Singles

As lead artist

As featured artist

Promotional singles

Other charted songs

Videos

Video albums

Music videos

Other appearances

Footnotes

References

External links
Bring Me the Horizon official website
Bring Me the Horizon discography at AllMusic
Bring Me the Horizon discography at Discogs
Bring Me the Horizon discography at MusicBrainz

Discography
Discographies of British artists
Heavy metal group discographies